Blue Hill Country Club is a private country club located in Canton, Massachusetts established in 1925. It has hosted professional tournaments on both the PGA Tour and LPGA Tour, including the PGA Championship, a major championship on the PGA Tour.

It includes two courses: the 18-hole Championship Course, designed in 1925 by Eugene "Skip" Wogan and the 9-hole Challenger Course, designed in 1961 by Wogan's son Phil. Both courses were restored in 2003 by Ron Prichard who specializes in Donald Ross golf course restorations.

The course is open to private and charity outings on Mondays between May and October.

Courses

Challenger Course
The Challenger Course is a 9-hole course designed in 1961. It has three sets of tees, and plays to 2,954 yards from the back, or black, tees.  (All measurements are in yards)

Champion Course
The Champion Course is an 18-hole course designed in 1925 and restored in 2003. It has four sets of tees and plays to 6,646 yards from the back, or black, tees. (All measurements are in yards)

note: the official course scorecards do not designate handicaps as "men's" or "women's."

Tournaments held
 1956 PGA Championship, major championship
1991-97 PING/Welch's Championship, LPGA Tour event

External links
Official site

1925 establishments in Massachusetts
Buildings and structures in Canton, Massachusetts
Golf clubs and courses in Massachusetts
Sports in Norfolk County, Massachusetts
Sports venues completed in 1925